Jrapi is a village in the Ani Municipality of the Shirak Province of Armenia. It was built to replace Nerkin Dzhrapi and Verin Dzhrapi which were to be flooded by the Akhurian Reservoir.

Demographics

References 

Populated places in Shirak Province